Pippa Greenwood is an English plant pathologist. She appears frequently on the BBC's long-running Gardeners' World television programme and has been a regular panellist on Gardeners' Question Time on BBC Radio 4 since 1994. She also was the gardening consultant on the ITV series Rosemary and Thyme in 2003–2006.

Qualifications and career
Greenwood studied at Durham University, where she trained as a botanist. She went on to gain an MSc in crop protection at Reading University in the 1980s. For eleven years she ran the Royal Horticultural Society's Plant Pathology Department at Wisley.

In 2007, Greenwood made a return visit to Durham University, where she was awarded an honorary doctorate.

Pippa Greenwood lives in Hampshire.

Bibliography
Gardener's Question Time: All Your Gardening Problems Solved,with co-authors John Cushnie, Bob Flowerdew, Bunny Guinness, Anne Swithinbank, illustrations by Bunny Guinness, and photographs from The Garden Picture Gallery and others, paperback, 325 pp., Bookmart Limited, 2005,

References

External links
Pippa Greenwood's Official Website
Celebrity gardener
Interview on 50connect
The GQT Panel: Pippa Greenwood. BBC website. Retrieved 2009-04-24.

British phytopathologists
English gardeners
British television presenters
English garden writers
Living people
Year of birth missing (living people)
Alumni of Trevelyan College, Durham
British women scientists
Women botanists
Alumni of the University of Reading
British women television presenters